Governor Cochran may refer to:

John P. Cochran (1809–1898), 43rd Governor of Delaware
Robert Leroy Cochran (1886–1963), 24th Governor of Nebraska